The following is an episode list from the second series of the Indonesian cooking show that based on the Japanese show, Iron Chef, known as Iron Chef Indonesia. The series began on 22 April 2017 and aired every Saturday and Sunday but started on 14 May 2017, this series was only aired every Sunday.

Episode 1

Airdate: 22 April 2017

Battles: Chris Salans (Iron Chef) vs Tommasso Paolo (Challenger Chef)

Main Ingredient: Lobster

Judges: 
Bara Pattiradjawane
Rinrin Marinka
Ferry Salim

Served Dishes:
Chris Salans:(1) Lobster Carpaccio Rujak (2) Lobster Bumbu Kuning (3) Lobster with Radish and Kecicang
Tommasso Paolo: (1) Lobster, Burrata and Squid Ink Rissoto Crackers(2) Surf and Turf (Chicken Cacciatore Fagotini with Butter Sauteed Lobster and Bisque Soup)(3) Wagyu Tenderloin, Lobster Tempura with Foie Grass, Vanilla and Lemon Potatoes

Scores & Winner:

Episode 2

Airdate: 23 April 2017

Battles: Sezai Zorlu (Iron Chef) vs Sam Wong (Challenger Chef)

Main Ingredient: Turkey Meat

Judges: 
Sandra Djohan
Ricky Harun 
Fenita Arie

Served Dishes:
Sezai Zorlu:(1) Cop Sis Kebab (2) Tajin Koffe (3) Turkish Grilled Turkey
Sam Wong: (1) Shredded Turkey with Lemon Grass Dressing (2) Ini Yang Dumpling with Gansu Sauce (3) Triangle Noodle Lamien and Roasted Slice Turkey 

Scores & Winner:

Episode 3

Airdate: 29 April 2017

Battles: Adhika Maxi (Iron Chef) vs Hans Christian (Challenger Chef)

Main Ingredient: Purple Sweet Potato

Judges: 
Alexander Nayoan
Sandra Djohan
Daniel Mananta

Served Dishes:
Adhika Maxi:(1) Purple Sweet Potato Mont Blanc Pie  (2) Purple Sweet Potato Ravioli with Purple Sweet Potato Truffle Cream and Crab Caviar  (3) Purple Sweet Potato Mille Fuille Gateux and Purple Sweet Potato Chantily with White Chocolate 
Hans Christian: (1) Tuna Tartare with Purple Sweet Potato Jamu (2) Wagyu Beef Striploin and Purple Sweet Potato Cooked in Three Ways with Miso-Mustard Emultion (3) Flavours of Kolak

Scores & Winner:

Episode 4

Airdate: 30 April 2017

Battles: Chris Salans (Iron Chef) vs Marjon Olguera (Challenger Chef)

Main Ingredients: Salmon & Tuna

Judges: 
Yono Purnomo
Mullie Marlina
Ayushita

Served Dishes:
Chris Salans:(1) Smoked Salmon Carpaccio with Cumin Leaves and Lime Juice (2) Tuna Tataki with Tabia Bun and Basil Sauce (3) Sesame Crusted Tuna with Exotic Fruit Salad and Sambal Matah-Kecombrang (4) Salmon Confit with Lemon, Turmeric and Kesum Leaves Dressing
Marjon Olguera: (1) Tuna Tartare with Wasabi Caviar, Ruby Grahpy Furitmiso Mayo, Fine Herbs and Lotus Chips (2) Tuna Tataki, Prawn Tempura, Green Papaya and Mango Salad with Spicy Broth (3) Tea Smoked Salmon, Chilled Herb Coddled Eggs on Toast with Oyster Sauce Broth (4) Roasted Salmon, Poached Yabbies, Asparagus and Shimaji Mushrooms with Vanilla Dressing

Scores & Winner:

Episode 5

Airdate: 6 May 2017

Battles: Sezai Zorlu (Iron Chef) vs Hamish Lindsay (Challenger Chef)

Main Ingredient: Prawn

Judges:
Bara Pattiradjawane
Amanda Zevannya
Ivan Casadevall

Served Dishes:
Sezai Zorlu:(1) Karides Sabitasi Nar Eksili (2) Kuskuslu Karides Kebab  (3) Karidesli Biber Dolmasi 
Hamish Lindsay: (1) Baked Prawn with Nori Creme Fraiche, Wasabi-Onion Confit and Toasted Nori(2) Grilled Prawns with Sam Tum Salad, Nam Jihm Dressing and Dragon Fruit Caviar (3) Potato Gnocchi with Butter Sauteed Prawns and Asparagus, Burro Nocciola and Bisque Sauce 

Scores & Winner:

Episode 6

Airdate: 7 May 2017

Battles: Adhika Maxi (Iron Chef) vs Takashie Tomie (Challenger Chef)

Main Ingredient: Pasta

Judges:
Arimbi Nimpuno
Cathy Sharon
Aing

Served Dishes:
Adhika Maxi:(1) Indonesian Aglio e Oglio (using Angel Hair Pasta) with Butter Sauteed Lobster  (2) Cannelloni Pasta with Scallop Mousse and Indonesian Curry Sauce  (3) Black Forest Raviolo Pasta 
Takashie Tomie: (1) Three Kind of Pasta Temaki (filled with Wasabi Paste, Tuna and Scallop) (2) Uni-Ikura with Sauteed Red Chillies and King Mushrooms, Salad Pasta, Yuzu Dressing and Roasted Red Snapper with Miso-White Sauce (3) Roasted Wagyu Beef and Kuro Goma Pasta with Uni Sauce 

Scores & Winner:

Episode 7

Airdate: 14 May 2017

Battles: Sezai Zorlu (Iron Chef) vs Hengky Efendy (Challenger Chef)

Main Ingredient: Oxtail

Judges: 
Matteo Guerinoni 
Ersa Mayori
Marcel Chandrawinata

Served Dishes:
Sezai Zorlu:(1) Turkish Oxtail Salad  (2) Turkish Wedding Soup  (3) Turkish Winter Stew with Vermicelli Rice
Hengky Efendy: (1) Oxtail Croquette (2)  Smoke Spicy Oxtail Tortellini and Consommé Broth (3) Charcoal Grilled Oxtail, Truffled Mashed Potatoes with Sweet Soya and Chili-Lime Sauce

Scores & Winner:

Episode 8

Airdate: 21 May 2017

Battles: Adhika Maxi (Iron Chef) vs Putri Mumpuni (Challenger Chef)

Main Ingredient: Duck Meat

Judges: 
Astrid Surya Tenggara
Nicky Tirta
Tika Panggabean

Served Dishes:
Adhika Maxi:(1) Grilled Duck Wrapped in Betel Leaves (2) Foie Gras Noodles with Duck Broth Soup and Scorpion Chili Sauce  (3) Crispy Skin Grilled Duck with Foie Gras Grilled Rice and Duck Fat Sambal
Putri Mumpuni: (1) Grilled Duck Wrapped in Pohpohan Leaves with Pineapple Pacri and Sambal Lado Mudo(2) Duck Wonton in Arsik Style Broth with Poached Daikon, Asparagus and Kecombrang Foam (3) Klungkung Smoked Duck with Fried Sambal, Duck Fat-Turmeric Confit and Sauteed Cassava Leaves

Scores & Winner:

Episode 9
Airdate: 4 June 2017

Battles: Sezai Zorlu (Iron Chef) vs Gloria Susindra (Challenger Chef)

Main Ingredient: Basa Fish

Judges: 
Frans Widjaja
Gwen Winarno
Irgi Fahrezi

Served Dishes:
Sezai Zorlu:(1) Ezmeli Balik (2) Bademli Balik (3) Karidesli Balik Baligi
Gloria Susindra: (1) Sate Lilit with Sambal Matah and Fish Roe (2) Basa Fish Tempura with Gulai Dashi(3) Spicy Blackened Basa Fish with Onion Soubise, Salsa Succotash and Squid Ink Foam

Scores & Winner:

Episode 10 (Revenge)
Airdate: 11 June 2017

Battles: Adhika Maxi (Iron Chef) vs Putri Mumpuni (Challenger Chef)

Main Ingredient: Squid

Judges: 
 Julia Veronica
 Rianti Cartwright
 Aing

Served Dishes:
Adhika Maxi:(1) Squid Salad with Dabu Dabu Sauce and Fried Calamari sauteed with Kecombrang (2) Squid Rawon with Squid Ink Risotto, Emping and Sauteed Squid with Salted Egg (3) Squid Velvet Cake
Putri Mumpuni: (1) Balinese Style Grilled Squid with Pegagan Leaves Salad using Base Genep Oil(2) Squid Pepes (using Woku Seasoning) with Kenikir Puree (3) Deconstruted Laksa (using Angel Hair Squid Ink Pasta) with Stuffed Braised Squid and Salmon Roe

Scores & Winner:

Episode 11
Airdate: 18 June 2017

Battles: Chris Salans (Iron Chef) vs Heri Purnama (Challenger Chef)

Main Ingredient: Rabbit Meat

Judges: 
 Stefu Santoso
 Meisya Siregar
 Ivan Casadevall

Served Dishes:
Chris Salans:(1) Seared Rabbit Loin with Sauteed Medjool Dates and Preserved Lemon Puree   (2) Smoked Rabbit Leg (stuffed with Rabbit Kidney and Rabbit Ribs) with Suna Sekuh Grilled Corn (3) Rabbit Murtabak with Apicius Sauce and Acar
Heri Purnama: (1) Rabbit Woku with Pumpkin Sauce and Ebatan Samosa (2) Taliwang Grilled Rabbit (3) Saddle of Rabbit (stuffed with Foie Gras, Spinach and Mushroom) with Lemon Grass and Ginger Foam

Scores & Winner:

Episode 12
Airdate: 2 July 2017

Battles: Sezai Zorlu (Iron Chef) vs Patrese Vito (Challenger Chef)

Main Ingredient: Cheese

Judges: 
 Alexander Nayoan
 Wulan Guritno
 Matteo Guerinoni

Served Dishes:
Sezai Zorlu:(1) Kozlemnis Peynirli Biber and Karidesli Peynirli Mantar  (2) Festigenti Patlican Sarmasi  (3) Ezmeli Balik
Patrese Vito: (1) Tomato and Burrata Salad(2) Parmesan Risotto with Grilled Rock Lobster, Sauteed Broccoli and Parmesan Foam  (3) Gorgonzola Crusted Sirloin with Sweet Potato Puree and Sauteed Mushroom

Scores & Winner:

Episode 13
Airdate: 9 July 2017

Battles: Chris Salans (Iron Chef) vs Eko Juniarto (Challenger Chef)

Main Ingredient: Quail Meat

Judges: 
 Petty Elliott
 Reino Barack
 Denada

Served Dishes:
Chris Salans:(1) Quail Tataki Carpaccio with Coffee-Cinnamon Dressing (2) Smoked and Roasted Quail with Foie Gras and Three Kinds of Nutmeg Fruit(3) Quail Rawon with Sambal Keluwak
Eko Juniarto: (1) Steamed Quail with Passion Fruit Sauce and Kecombrang Salad(2) Smoked and Roasted Quail with Apple-Peach Compote and Truffle Oil(3) Diamond Peking-Style Quail with Pomegranate Dressing, Sauteed Mushroom and Pearl Vegetables

Scores & Winner:

Episode 14
Airdate: 16 July 2017

Battles: Sezai Zorlu (Iron Chef) vs Jacob Burrell (Challenger Chef)

Main Ingredient: Crab 

Judges: 
 Chandra Yudasswara
 Olla Ramlan 
 Mario Lawalata 

Served Dishes:
Sezai Zorlu:(1) Yengec Yarik (2) Yengecli Pirasa Corbasi (3) Yengecli Kabagi Dolmasi
Jacob Burrell: (1) Crispy Soft Shell Crab with Sliced Coconut mixed with Yoghurt, Sliced Honeydew Melon and Dill(2) Sauteed and Smoked King Crab with Grilled Seaweed Rolls (stuffed with Chinese Cabbage), Dijon Mustard-Rice Vinegar Dressing and Oyster Emultion Sauce(3) Broth of Crab (using Dungeness Crab) with Shredded Chicken Thighs and Kulat Pelawan Mushroom

Scores & Winner:

Episode 15
Airdate: 23 July 2017

Battles: Chris Salans (Iron Chef) vs Christopher Herlambang (Challenger Chef)

Main Ingredient: Pumpkin

Judges: 
 Gwen Winarno
 Jed Doble
 Fitri Tropica

Served Dishes:
Chris Salans:(1) Pumpkin Gnocchi with Grated Parmesan Cheese and Pumpkin Sauce (2) Grilled Kabocha Pumpkin with Pumpkin Puree, Steamed Turbot Fish and Crumbled Tempe (3) Deconstructed Kolak
Christopher Herlambang: (1) Roasted Scallop with Pumpkin Puree, Roasted Pumpkin, Roasted Aparagus and Avruga Caviar(2) Pumpkin Risotto with Black Truffle and Edamame (3) Seared Wagyu Sirloin with Roasted Pumpkin, Pickled Pumpkin, Eggplant Puree and Port Reduction Sauce

Scores & Winner:

Episode 16
Airdate: 30 July 2017

Battles: Sezai Zorlu (Iron Chef) vs Supandi (Challenger Chef)

Main Ingredient: Lamb

Judges: 
 Arnold Poernomo
 Natasha Lucas
 Christian Sugiono

Served Dishes:
Sezai Zorlu:(1) Yarmali Nohutlu Corbasi (2) Enginarli Kuzu Pirzola (3) Kagit Kebab with Ayran
Supandi: (1) Seared Marinated Lamb Tataki with Raspberry-Mint Sauce and Lalapan(2) Lamb Gulai Rolls with Cassava Leaves, Mashed Cassava and Sauteed Papaya Flowers(3) Rosemary Lamb Cheesecake

Scores & Winner:

Episode 17
Airdate: 6 August 2017

Battles: Sezai Zorlu (Iron Chef) vs Theodorus Immanuel (Challenger Chef)

Main Ingredient: Cemani Chicken

Judges: 
 Wina Bissett
 Arnold Poernomo
 Shandy Aulia

Served Dishes:
Sezai Zorlu:(1) Tavuk Kulah (2) Bademli Tavuk (3) Soganli Siyah Tavuk
Theodorus Immanuel: (1) Cemani Chicken Croquette with Sambal Matah, Pickled Ribbon Cucumber and Carrot and Garlic-Chilli Crumble(2) Steamed and Baked Honey Glazed Cemani Chicken with Tamarind Sauce(3) Cemani Chicken and Wild Mushroom Dumpling with Kalio Sauce and Sauteed Spinach with Orange Sauce

Scores & Winner:

Episode 18
Airdate: 13 August 2017

Battles: Adhika Maxi (Iron Chef) vs Desi Trisnawati (Challenger Chef)

Main Ingredient: Clam

Judges: 
 Shanti Serad
 Vindex Tengker
 Aline Adita

Served Dishes:
Adhika Maxi:(1) Clams Casino (Horse Mussel Yellow Curry Gratin and Horse Mussel-Stuffed Zucchini Gratin) (2) Clams Chowder (3) Horse Mussel Noodles with Laksa Broth
Desi Trisnawati: (1) Misty Clam (Horse Mussel Ceviche with Pohpohan Leaves, Colo-Colo Sambal and Caviar) (2) Blue Ocean (Steamed Green Mussel and Scallop with Telang Flower Broth and Kecombrang Foam)(3) Atlantis (Grilled Green Mussel Rolls with Corn Micro Sponge and Deconstructed Sambal Dabu-Dabu and Sambal Korek)(4) Extra Dish: Underwater Volcano (Baked Alaska Style Klappertaart with Rum Sauce and Cinnamon Powder)

Scores & Winner:

Episode 19
Airdate: 20 August 2017

Battles: Sezai Zorlu (Iron Chef) vs Edi Pancamala (Challenger Chef)

Main Ingredient: Octopus

Judges: 
 Anandita Makes
 Nicky Tirta
 Arimbi Nimpuno

Served Dishes:
Sezai Zorlu:(1) Greek Style Grilled Octopus with Grilled Baby Carrot, Grilled Watermelon and Grilled Baby Potato (2) Saffron and Brown Lentils Soup with Grilled Octopus and Grilled Pumpkin (3) Octopus Couscous
Edi Pancamala: (1) Mediterranean Octopus Salad with Grilled Japanese Eggplant and Pomegranate Sauce(2) Grilled Octopus with Squid Ink Congee, Grilled Scallop, Sauteed Green Peas and Red Pepper Emultion Sauce(3) Grilled Octopus with Grilled Sea Bass, Eggplant Puree and Brown Butter Sauce

Scores & Winner:

Episode 20
Airdate: 27 August 2017

Battles: Zulkarnain Dahlan (Challenger Chef) vs Chris Salans (Iron Chef)

Main Ingredient: Egg

Judges: 
 Yono Purnomo 
 Marissa Nasution
 Matteo Guerinoni

Served Dishes:
Chris Salans:(1) Floating Egg (Soft Boiled Egg with Whipped Cream, Crumbled Tempe and Ossetra Caviar) (2) Deconstructed Omelette (3) Coconut Milk, Pandan and Mango Puree Spherefication with French Toast
Zulkarnain Dahlan: (1) Deconstructed Rujak Aceh with Freeze Scrambled Eggs and Kecombrang Foam(2) Mie Aceh with Fried Enoki, Kobe Beef Steak and Hollandaise Sauce(3) Revisited Fried Banana

Scores & Winner:

Episode 21
Airdate: 3 September 2017

Battles: Adhika Maxi (Iron Chef) vs Deni Sugiarto (Challenger Chef)

Main Ingredient: Coconut

Judges: 
 Vindex Tengker
 Aline Adita
 Alexander Nayoan

Served Dishes:
Adhika Maxi:(1) Coconut Chawanmushi with Coconut Gruel, Coconut Meatballs, Coconut Salad, Coconut Cracker and Gulai Broth (2) Nasi Uduk with Urap, Serundeng Beef Steak and Coconut Milk-Chili Sambal (3) Kopyor Cake with Shredded Coconut and Coconut Jelly
Deni Sugiarto: (1) Tuna Tartare with Caviar, Lawar and Sambal Matah(2) Roasted Lamb Rack with Spicy Herb Serundeng, Botok-Stuffed Nasi Liwet and Gulai Sauce (3) Coconut Pudding with Coconut Crumble, Jackfruit Coulis and Palm Sugar Sauce

Scores & Winner:

Episode 22
Airdate: 10 September 2017

Battles: Chris Salans (Iron Chef) vs Nazario Orlando (Challenger Chef)

Main Ingredient: Caviar

Judges: 
 Ragil Wibowo
 Meisya Siregar
 Reino Barack

Served Dishes:
Chris Salans:(1) Escolar Carpaccio with Vanilla Dressing, Andaliman Pepper and Caviar(2) Cauliflower Panna Cotta with Oyster Jelly and Caviar(3) Salmon Confit with Kaffir Lime-Honey Dressing, Caviar and Kaffir Lime Salad
Nazario Orlando: (1) Marinated Langoustine with Caviar, Buratta Cream, Quail Boiled Egg and Cafetiere Consomme (2) Arborio Risotto with Smoked Salmon, Chopped Asparagus and Caviar(3) White Chocolate Mascarpone Mousse with Caviar and Amaretto Crumble

Scores & Winner:

Episode 23
Airdate: 17 September 2017

Battles: Sezai Zorlu (Iron Chef) vs Dody Jie (Challenger Chef)

Main Ingredient: Sole Fish

Judges: 
Gilles Marx
Gracia Indri
Dwi Satrio

Served Dishes:
Sezai Zorlu:(1) Lemon Grilled Sole Fish with Grilled Potato, Grilled Zucchini and Toasted Pistachio (2) Butter Grilled Sole Fish with Grilled Asparagus, Grilled Purple Broccoli, Grilled Tomato and Aparagus-Purple Broccoli Sauce  (3) Baked Sole Fish in Salt with Steamed Spinach, Grilled Pumpkin, Toasted Pine Nut and Duo Sauce
Dody Jie: (1) Gado-Gado with Sole Fish Sate Lilit(2) Butter Grilled Sole Fish with Tomato Rice, Apple Salsa and Lime-Pistachio Sauce(3) Fried Sole Fish Cheese Tart with Sliced Strawberry, Raspberry, Mango Sauce, Almond Crumble and Almond Flax

Scores & Winner:

Episode 24 (Revenge)
Airdate: 24 September 2017

Battles: Chris Salans (Iron Chef) vs Nazario Orlando (Challenger Chef)

Main Ingredient: Fruits

Judges: 
Haryo Pramoe
Vidi Aldiano
Bara Pattiradjawane

Served Dishes:
Chris Salans:(1) Sauteed Langoustine with Mushroom Carpaccio and Exotic Fruits Dressing and Fruit Salad with Rujak Dressing (2) Asinan Bogor ala Chris Salans (3) Durian and Chocolate Filo Pastry with Sliced Jackfruit, Tape Ketan Hitam Sauce and Coconut-Pandan Leaves Emulsion
Nazario Orlando: (1) Crab Salmoriglio with Fruit Salad, Mango Zabaione and Slow Cooked Ricotta(2) Fruitti Surf and Turf (Wagyu Tenderloin Steak with Grilled Lobster, Grilled Pineapple, Fruit Salad and Foie Gras)(3) Chocolate Macarons with Banana-Chocolate Cremeux, Cold Meringue, Chopped Jackfruit and Crumble

Scores & Winner:

Episode 25
Airdate: 1 October 2017

Battles: Sezai Zorlu (Iron Chef) vs Francesco Greco (Challenger Chef)

Main Ingredient: Mushroom

Judges: 
Astrid Suryatenggara
Dwi Satrio
Nadine Chandrawinata

Served Dishes:
Sezai Zorlu:(1) Mantarli Ravioli (2) Yumurtali Mantar (3) Mantarli Nohutlu Kofte
Francesco Greco: (1) TBA(2) TBA(3) TBA

Scores & Winner:

Episode 26
Airdate: 8 October 2017

Battles: Adhika Maxi (Iron Chef) vs Lucky Andreono (Challenger Chef)

Main Ingredient: Eel

Judges: 
Santhi Serad
Primo Rizky
Kimberly Rider

Served Dishes:
Adhika Maxi:(1) TBA (2) TBA (3) TBA
Lucky Andreono: (1) TBA(2) TBA(3) TBA

Scores & Winner:

Episode 27
Airdate: 15 October 2017

Battles: Chris Salans (Iron Chef) vs Budi Lee (Challenger Chef)

Main Ingredient: Wagyu

Judges: 
Rinrin Marinka
Ivan Casadevall
Ayu Dewi

Served Dishes:
Chris Salans:(1) TBA (2) TBA (3) TBA
Budi Lee: (1) TBA(2) TBA(3) TBA

Scores & Winner:

Episode 28
Airdate: 22 October 2017

Battles: Adhika Maxi (Iron Chef) vs Muhammad Fahsihullisan (Challenger Chef)

Main Ingredient: Tofu

Judges: 
Erza ST
Widi Mulia
Gilles Marx

Served Dishes:
Adhika Maxi:(1) TBA (2) TBA (3) TBA
Muhammad Fahsihullisan: (1) TBA(2) TBA(3) Tofu

Scores & Winner:

Episode 29
Airdate: 12 November 2017

Battles: Sezai Zorlu (Iron Chef) vs Benny Sarta (Challenger Chef)

Main Ingredient: Beef brain

Judges: 
Ade Putri
Gupta Sitorus
Ashanty

Served Dishes:
TBA:(1) TBA (2) TBA (3) TBA
TBA: (1) TBA(2) TBA(3) TBA

Scores & Winner:

Episode 30
Airdate: 19 November 2017

Battles: Chris Salans (Iron Chef) vs Denny Gunawan (Challenger Chef)

Main Ingredient: Foie gras

Judges: 
Irfan Hakim
Petty Elliott
Erza ST

Served Dishes:
Chris Salans:(1) TBA (2) TBA (3) TBA
Denny Gunawan: (1) TBA(2) TBA(3) TBA

Scores & Winner:

Notes

References

Indonesia
RCTI original programming
Indonesian reality television series
Indonesian-language television shows